Kehinde Bankole  (born 27 March 1985) is a Nigerian actress, model, and television host. She made her entertainment debut in Miss Commonwealth Nigeria 2003, then proceeded with MBGN 2004. She was named Revelation of the Year at the 2009 Best of Nollywood Awards, two years after her first screen feature in Wale Adenuga's Super Story.

Personal life 
Bankole was born in Ogun State as the fourth child, out of six of architect Babatunde Bankole and Titilayo Bankole, an administrative secretary. She has a twin sister, Taiwo, who also acts occasionally. She completed her primary education at Tunwase Nursery and Primary School, Ikeja before studying Mass Communication at Olabisi Onabanjo University, but took a break to concentrate more on her modeling career in 2004.

Career

Modelling career 
Bankole first entertainment experience was when she auditioned as a contestant in Miss Commonwealth Nigeria pageant in 2003, although she did not win, she claimed the "exposure" was all she really wanted as she made the top 10. She also had a shot at Most Beautiful Girl in Nigeria but could not make the top five list. After the contract of Genevieve Nnaji expired as a Lux ambassador, Kehinde Bankole was chosen along with Sylvia Udeogu and Olaide Olaogun to become the new face of Lux in 2007.

Acting 
Bankole made her acting debut during her reign as Lux ambassador in the family drama Super Story: Everything it Takes, playing the character Caro. She has also starred in other Wale Adenuga's productions like Papa Ajasco and This Life. On television, her most notable role is as housewife Kiki Obi in Desperate Housewives Africa, the Nigerian remake of the American hit series. She also featured in the movie Prophetess also starring Toyin Abraham

Talk show host 
She hosts daytime talkshows including "Soul Sisters" and "African Kitchen".

Filmography

Awards and nominations

References

External links 
 Kehinde Bankole at the Internet Movie Database

20th-century births
21st-century Nigerian actresses
Nigerian television personalities
Nigerian female models
Yoruba actresses
Yoruba women television personalities
Yoruba beauty pageant contestants
Olabisi Onabanjo University alumni
Nigerian twins
Actresses in Yoruba cinema
Living people
Year of birth missing (living people)
Nigerian television actresses
Nigerian film actresses
Fraternal twins
Nigerian beauty pageant contestants
Actors from Ogun State
Nigerian television presenters
Most Beautiful Girl in Nigeria contestants